Georgios Mitsibonas (Greek: Γεώργιος Μητσιμπόνας; 11 November 1962 – 13 September 1997) was a Greek football player during the 1980s and 1990s.

Biography
Mitsibonas was born in 1962 in the village of Tsaritsani (Larissa regional unit). He started his football career as a centre forward in Ikonomos Tsaritsanis and in 1981 he signed with AEL where he played one year as a forward. In 1982 the coach of Larissa used him as a sweeper, and as a defender Mitsibonas made a great career. With Larissa he won a Greek Football Cup in 1985 and a Greek football Championship in 1988. This championship was and still remains a huge success, as Larissa became the first, and until now, only team not based in Athens or Thessaloniki to have won the Greek championship. Mitsibonas is believed to be the best Larissa defender and one of the greatest Greek defenders in history. In 1989, he moved to PAOK and three years later he signed with the team of Olympiacos where he won a Greek Football Cup. In 1994, he returned to Larissa, but nothing was like before. Many good players had left the team and Larissa eventually in 1996 failed to remain in the first division. Then Mitsibonas moved to AE Tyrnavos, a team in the Greek Third Division, in the city of Tyrnavos, the second biggest of the Larissa regional unit after Larissa.

Death
On 13 September 1997 Mitsibonas was killed in a car crash near the village of Giannouli outside Larissa. He was only thirty-five and left behind his wife and his two daughters. He left also of course a large career, 413 matches and 43 goals in the first Greek division (he played 344 matches and scored 38 goals with AEL) and 27 matches and one goal with the national team of Greece. He was one of the biggest football players not only of Larissa, but also of Greek football.

Honours
AEL
 Greek Championship (1): 1987–88
 Greek Cup: 1985

1962 births
1997 deaths
Greek footballers
Super League Greece players
Olympiacos F.C. players
PAOK FC players
Greece international footballers
Athlitiki Enosi Larissa F.C. players
Road incident deaths in Greece
Association football defenders
People from Larissa (regional unit)
Footballers from Thessaly